The following is the filmography of actor and director David Carradine (1936–2009).

Film

Television series

Television films

Music video

Audiobooks

Video game

Notes

References

External links
 

Male actor filmographies
Director filmographies
American filmographies